Ervita is a village in Järva Parish, Järva County in northern-central Estonia.

Ervita manor
Ervita manor is mentioned for the first time in 1663. The present building dates from the early 19th century and is a simple Neoclassical building.

Russian general Gotthard Johann von Knorring was originally from Ervita manor.

References

External links
Ervita manor at Estonian Manors Portal

Villages in Järva County
Manor houses in Estonia
Kreis Jerwen